Eduardo Struvay was the defending champion but lost in the second round to Facundo Bagnis.

Bagnis won the title after defeating Horacio Zeballos 3–6, 6–3, 7–6(7–4) in the final.

Seeds

Draw

Finals

Top half

Bottom half

References
Main Draw
Qualifying Draw

Open Bogota - Singles